Alden T. Vaughan (born 1929) is an American historian, having taught at Columbia University, has published several books about New England and Indians in the 17th and 18th centuries and has been largely collected by libraries. His current research is studying the relationships between the Native Americans and non-native settlers.

References

1929 births
Living people
Columbia University faculty
20th-century American historians
American male non-fiction writers
20th-century American male writers